Karissa Schweizer (born May 4, 1996) is an American middle- and long-distance runner, Olympian and World Record holder in the women's 4x1500 meters relay. She competed in the 2020 Tokyo Olympics in the 5000 meters and 10,000 meters events finishing 11th and 12th, respectively. In 2020, she set the indoor 3000 meters American Record with a time of 8:25.70. 

Representing the University of Missouri, she won the 2016 NCAA Division I Cross Country Championships and holds five other NCAA individual championship titles including being the two-time NCAA Champion in the 5000 meters event. She is the American collegiate record-holder for the indoor 3000 meters run with a time of 8:41.60. She closed out her collegiate career as the most decorated female athlete in University of Missouri history.

Early career 
Schweizer grew up in Urbandale, Iowa and attended Dowling Catholic High School. She is the daughter of Mike and Kathy (Petricka) Schweizer, both of whom had successful collegiate track careers at Mankato State, with her father earning All-American honors. Karissa's grandfather, Frank Schweizer, was a NCAA Division II All-American runner at Mankato State. He coached track at Dowling Catholic High School for over four decades but retired before Karissa began her high school career. Her family has a rich running heritage at Dowling with her father and uncles, Steve and Doug, running track for the school. Her siblings Kelsey and Ryan also ran for Dowling, with Ryan winning eight state championships including a swimming title. He also ran a 3:49.04 PR in the 1500m to earn him a 3rd at the 2017 USA Track and Field Junior Championships. He is a member of the University of Notre Dame's track team. Karissa's cousins Alexis and Tyler ran cross-country for Dowling and a younger cousin, Lily, competed in 5th-grade track at Saint Francis.

Karissa never won an individual state or national cross-country title while at Dowling, never qualified for the Foot Locker Cross Country Championships, and her only track title was for 3 kilometer the 2011 IAHSAA championships.

Collegiate career (2014-2018) 
Recruited to the University of Missouri for track and cross country in 2014, Schweizer's first NCAA championship appearance was at the 2014 NCAA Division I Cross Country Championships, where she finished 155th. Two years later, she qualified for and placed third in the 5000 m at the 2016 NCAA Division I Outdoor Track and Field Championships.

The following cross country season, Schweizer was not considered a favorite for the individual NCAA title. Despite this, Schweizer defeated favorites Erin Finn and Anna Rohrer to win the 6 kilometer race in 19:41.6, becoming the first female national champion in any sport in Missouri Tigers history.

Schweizer ran the 3000 m and 5000 m at the next 2017 NCAA Division I Indoor Track and Field Championships, finishing second and first respectively. At the 2017 NCAA Division I Outdoor Track and Field Championships, Schweizer ran 15:39.93 in the 5000 m to win her third national collegiate title.

Despite victories at the 2017 NCAA Midwest Region and Southeastern Conference cross country championships, Schweizer did not repeat her win at the 2017 NCAA Division I Cross Country Championships, finishing 11th. That following indoor season, she completed her first title defense by winning the 5000m at the 2018 NCAA Division I Indoor Track and Field Championships, in addition to a 3000m victory.

She won the Honda Sports Award as the nation's top female cross country runner in 2017.

It was also at this time that Schweizer began competing at higher-profile invitational meets. At the 2018 Dr. Sander Invitational at the Armory Track & Field Center, Schweizer finished third in an international open mile field, her time of 4:27.54 placing her among the top five collegians all-time indoors. Later that season at the Millrose Games, Schweizer set the American collegiate record in the 3000m with a time of 8:41.60, her time beating Olympic medalist Jenny Simpson's previous record by one second. In the 2018 NCAA Division I Outdoor Track and Field Championships, Schweizer ran 32:14.94 in the 10,000m to finish third, twelve seconds under the existing meet record, set by Sylvia Mosqueda thirty years earlier. Two days later, after leading most of race, she easily repeated her 2017 5,000-meters win, closing out her remarkable college career with her sixth NCAA outdoor championship and NCAA indoor championship gold, a silver and two bronze medals.

Professional career

Schweizer signed professionally with the Bowerman Track Club in 2018.

Schweizer, running the fastest time 5K in the U.S. during the summer season, recorded a personal best 15:01.63 during a win at the Sunset Tour on July 10, 2019, in Azusa, California.

On February 28, 2020, at Boston University's "Last Chance Invitational" meet, Schweizer set a new indoor American Record in the 3000 m of 8:25.70. Her Bowerman Track Club teammates Shelby Houlihan and Colleen Quigley finished close behind in 8:26.66 and 8:28.71, respectively. Schweizer broke Shalane Flanagan's 2007 indoor AR by over seven seconds. Also, her time was faster than Mary Slaney's outdoor record of 8:25.83, set in 1985.

On July 10, 2020, Schweizer finished second to Shelby Houlihan in a 5000 m race conducted by the Bowerman Track Club with a new personal best of 14:26.34.  Houlihan won the race in a new American Record of 14:23.92.  Schweizer's time beat Houlihan's former American Record of 14:34.45 and made her the 14th fastest performer of all-time.

On July 23, 2020, Schweizer set a new world leading time in addition to a new personal best in the 1500m, at 4:00.02, which made her the 8th fastest American to ever run the event, finishing in front of Colleen Quigley and Courtney Frerichs in 4:03.98 and 4:07.39, respectively.

On July 31, 2020, Schweizer, along with Colleen Quigley, Elise Cranny and Shelby Houlihan established a World Record in the women's 4x1500 meters relay with a time of 16:27.02, eclipsing the previous World Record of 16:33.58 set by a quarter of Kenyan runners on May 25, 2014. The record was ratified in December 2020,

On June 21, 2021, in 94-degree heat in Eugene, Oregon, Schweitzer finished 0.3 seconds behind Bowerman Track Club teammate Elise Cranny in the 5000m, qualifying for the U.S. Olympic team with a 15:28.11. Cranny had run the last 400 meters in 63.72 seconds.  Schweitzer had Achilles surgery that fall.

On May 27, 2022, at the Prefontaine Classic in Eugene, competing in the 10,000m event, Schweitzer and Alicia Monson ran together for the last 5,000 meters, which they covered in under 15 minutes. Schweitzer edged Monson by a step crossing the finish line in 30:49.56. It qualified both for the World Athletics Championships United States team to be held in Eugene, Oregon.

Competition record

References 

Living people
American female track and field athletes
American female middle-distance runners
American female long-distance runners
Missouri Tigers women's track and field athletes
Sportspeople from Iowa
Track and field athletes from Iowa
People from Urbandale, Iowa
University of Missouri alumni
1996 births
Athletes (track and field) at the 2020 Summer Olympics
Olympic track and field athletes of the United States
20th-century American women
21st-century American women